Velyka Pysarivka is an urban-type settlement in Sumy Oblast in northeastern Ukraine. It was formerly the administrative center of Velyka Pysarivka Raion, but is now administered within Okhtyrka Raion. It is located close to the border with Russia, on the left bank of the Vorskla, a tributary of the Dnieper. Population:

Economy

Transportation
The settlement is connected by roads with Bohodukhiv, with Sumy via Krasnopillia, and across the border with Grayvoron in Russia.

The closest railway station is in Bohodukhiv, on the railway connecting Kharkiv and Sumy.

History
During World War II, Velyka Pisarivka was occupied by Nazi troops in October 1941. During the occupation, the Nazis executed 36 villagers while 176 were deported to Germany for forced labour. After a failed attempt by Soviet soldiers in early 1943, The village was finally liberated in August 1943.

2022 Russian invasion

On 24 February, as part of the 2022 Russian invasion of Ukraine, Russian forces entered Sumy Oblast near Sumy, Shostka, and Okhtyrka. According to the Sumy Oblast governor Dmytro Zhyvytskyi, fighting began at 07:30 on the outskirts of the city in the direction of Velyka Pysarivka. According to Ukrainian state employee Anton Herashchenko, Russian forces could not occupy the city, and retreated the following day, leaving tanks and equipment.

References

Urban-type settlements in Okhtyrka Raion
Bogodukhovsky Uyezd